Cotelnic Dragos (born 17 July 1987, in Bucharest) is a Romanian water polo player. At the 2012 Summer Olympics, he competed for the Romania men's national water polo team in the men's event. He is 6 ft 8 inches tall.

References

Romanian male water polo players
1987 births
Living people
Olympic water polo players of Romania
Water polo players at the 2012 Summer Olympics
Water polo players from Bucharest